List of Oxford cricketers may refer to:
List of Oxford University Cricket Club players
List of Oxford UCCE & MCCU players
List of Oxford and Cambridge Universities cricket team players
List of Oxfordshire County Cricket Club List A players